Mansour Rashidi  is a retired Iranian football goalkeeper who played for Iran in the 1976 Asian Cup and 1972 Summer Olympics. He also played for Taj SC.

Record at Olympic Games

Honours

Club
Taj
Takht Jamshid Cup: 1974–75
Hazfi Cup: 1976–77

International
Iran
Asian Cup: 1976

References

External links

Iran international footballers
Iranian footballers
Esteghlal F.C. players
1947 births
Living people
Asian Games gold medalists for Iran
Footballers at the 1972 Summer Olympics
Footballers at the 1976 Summer Olympics
Olympic footballers of Iran
1976 AFC Asian Cup players
People from Masjed Soleyman
AFC Asian Cup-winning players
Asian Games medalists in football
Association football goalkeepers
Footballers at the 1974 Asian Games
Medalists at the 1974 Asian Games
Sportspeople from Khuzestan province
Persepolis F.C. players
Naft Tehran F.C. players
20th-century Iranian people